Bombora is an indigenous Australian term for large waves breaking over submerged rock shelves.

Bombora may also refer to:

Music
 "Bombora", a 1963 song by the Atlantics, or their 1963 album
 "Bombora", a 1963 song by the Original Surfaris, or their 1995 album
 The Bomboras, a 1990s American instrumental surf band

Other uses
BomBora (Lagoon), a roller coaster in Farmington, Utah, US
Bombora (vodka), an Australian brand of vodka
Bombora, Burkina Faso, a town in Burkina Faso
 Bombora, a former Soviet military airfield near Gudauta, Abkhazia, Georgia
 Bombora: The Story of Australian Surfing, a 2009 Australian television documentary nominated for a 2010 Logie Award
Bombora, a 1996 novel by Tegan Bennett Daylight